Saudi Arabia national under-17 football team also known as Saudi Arabia Under-17 or Saudi Arabia junior team, represents Saudi Arabia in international association football competitions in AFC U-17 Championship and FIFA U-17 World Cup, as well as any other under-17 international football tournaments.

The team won the 1989 FIFA U-16 World Championship and became the first Asian team to win a FIFA tournament. As of September 2019, they also became the only Asian men's football team to win any FIFA tournaments.

Honours
FIFA U-17 World Cup
 Winners (1): 1989

AFC U-16 Championship
 Winners (2): 1985, 1988
 Third place (2): 1986, 1992

Arab Cup U-17
 Winners (1): 2011
 Runners-up (1): 2014

Competitions record

FIFA U-17 World Cup

*Draws include knockout matches decided on penalty kicks.

AFC U-16 Championship

*Draws include knockout matches decided on penalty kicks.

Arab Cup U-17

*Draws include knockout matches decided on penalty kicks.

Previous squads

FIFA U-16 World Championship squads
1985 FIFA U-16 World Championship
1987 FIFA U-16 World Championship
1989 FIFA U-16 World Championship

See also
 Saudi Arabia national football team
 Saudi Arabia national under-23 football team
 Saudi Arabia national under-20 football team

References

Asian national under-17 association football teams
Under-17